Duz Aghol (also Romanized as Dūz Āghol and Dūz Āghel; also known as Dooz Aghlī, Duzagal, and Dūz Āghlī) is a village in Qarah Quyun-e Jonubi Rural District, Qarah Quyun District, Showt County, West Azerbaijan Province, Iran. At the 2006 census, its population was 213, in 56 families.

References 

Populated places in Showt County